Complete Live at the Spotlite Club 1958 is a live album by American jazz pianist Ahmad Jamal featuring performances recorded at the Spotlight club in Washington D.C. in 1958, some of which were originally released on the albums Ahmad Jamal Trio Volume IV and Portfolio of Ahmad Jamal on the Argo label.

Reception 
The Allmusic review awarded the album 5 stars stating "Best heard at sunset, late at night by candlelight, or in a cozy room softly illumined by indirect incandescence, this music offers the listener an opportunity to savor both what Jamal plays and what he doesn't play. His sense of timing, the way he employs contrasting dynamics and his quirky flair for the dramatic have always made Ahmad Jamal an exciting performer. His Spotlite recordings are filled with surprises and exhilarating passages".

Track listing 
Disc One:
 "Ahmad's Blues" (Ahmad Jamal) - 4:04 Originally released on Portfolio of Ahmad Jamal 
 "It Could Happen to You" (Johnny Burke, Jimmy Van Heusen) - 4:17 Originally released on Portfolio of Ahmad Jamal  
 "I Wish I Knew" (Mack Gordon, Harry Warren) - 3:45 Originally released on Ahmad Jamal Trio Volume IV  
 "Autumn Leaves" (Joseph Kosma, Johnny Mercer, Jacques Prévert) - 7:39 Originally released on Portfolio of Ahmad Jamal  
 "Stompin' at the Savoy" (Edgar Sampson) - 4:15 Originally released on Ahmad Jamal Trio Volume IV  
 "Cheek to Cheek" (Irving Berlin) - 4:47 Originally released on Ahmad Jamal Trio Volume IV  
 "The Girl Next Door" (Ralph Blane, Hugh Martin) - 3:26 
 "Secret Love" (Sammy Fain, Paul Francis Webster) - 3:52 Originally released on Ahmad Jamal Trio Volume IV  
 "Squatty Roo" (Johnny Hodges) - 2:19 Originally released on Ahmad Jamal Trio Volume IV  
 "Taboo" (Margarita Lecuona, Bob Russell) - 4:01 Originally released on Ahmad Jamal Trio Volume IV  
 "Autumn in New York" (Vernon Duke) - 3:18 
 "A Gal in Calico" (Leo Robin, Arthur Schwartz) - 4:44 Originally released on Portfolio of Ahmad Jamal  
 "That's All" (Alan Brandt, Bob Haymes) - 2:38 Originally released on Ahmad Jamal Trio Volume IV  
 "Should I?" (Nacio Herb Brown, Arthur Freed) - 3:41 Originally released on Ahmad Jamal Trio Volume IV  
Disc Two:
 "Seleritus" (Ahmad Jamal) - 3:13 Originally released on Portfolio of Ahmad Jamal  
 "Let's Fall in Love" (Harold Arlen, Ted Koehler) - 5:09 Originally released on Portfolio of Ahmad Jamal  
 "This Can't Be Love" (Lorenz Hart, Richard Rodgers) - 5:12 Originally released on Portfolio of Ahmad Jamal  
 "Old Devil Moon" (Yip Harburg, Burton Lane) - 3:56 Originally released on Portfolio of Ahmad Jamal  
 "Ivy" (Hoagy Carmichael) - 3:08 Originally released on Portfolio of Ahmad Jamal  
 "Tater Pie" (Harold Ashby) - 3:07 Originally released on Portfolio of Ahmad Jamal 
 "Aki & Ukthay (Brother and Sister) (Jamal) - 3:16 Originally released on Portfolio of Ahmad Jamal 
 "You Don't Know What Love Is (Gene de Paul, Don Raye) - 3:30 Originally released on Portfolio of Ahmad Jamal 
 "I Didn't Know What Time It Was" (Hart, Rodgers) - 4:35 Originally released on Portfolio of Ahmad Jamal 
 "So Beats My Heart for You" (Pat Ballard, Charles Henderson, Tom Waring) - 3:42 Originally released on Portfolio of Ahmad Jamal 
 "Our Delight" (Tadd Dameron) - 3:00 Originally released on Portfolio of Ahmad Jamal 
 "Soft Winds" (Benny Goodman, Fletcher Henderson) – 3:22 Studio take originally released as 45rpm single 
 "Secret Love" (Fain, Webster) - 2:50 Studio take originally released as 45rpm single  
 "Taking a Chance on Love" (Duke) - 1:52 Studio take originally released as 45rpm single

Personnel 
Ahmad Jamal - piano
Israel Crosby - bass
Vernel Fournier - drums

References 

Argo Records live albums
Ahmad Jamal live albums
2007 live albums